Kerch Seaport Komysh-Burun is a seaport in the Arshyntseve district, in the industrial zone of Kerch, which specializes in transshipment of ferroalloys, coal, ilmenite, manganese ores, coke, and general cargo.

See also

List of ports in Ukraine
Transport in Ukraine
Cargo turnover of Ukrainian ports
Komysh-Burunsky iron ore plant

References

Companies established in 1951
Buildings and structures in Crimea
Ports of Crimea
Enterprises of Kerch
Sanctioned due to Russo-Ukrainian War
1951 in Ukraine
Kerch Strait
Ports and harbours of the Sea of Azov